|}

The Prix Vicomtesse Vigier is a Group 2 flat horse race in France open to thoroughbreds aged four years or older. It is run at Longchamp over a distance of 3,100 metres (about 1 mile and 7½ furlongs), and it is scheduled to take place each year in May.

History
The event was established in 1859 and named after the Viscountess Vigier. It was originally the second leg of a pair of races called the Prix Biennal. The first leg, for three-year-olds, was created a year earlier. The version for older horses was initially contested over 3,200 metres. It was cancelled because of the Franco-Prussian War in 1871, and it was cut to 3,000 metres in 1897. It was abandoned throughout World War I, with no running from 1915 to 1918.

Both legs of the Prix Biennal were given a new title, the Prix Jean Prat, in 1940. This was in memory of Jean Prat (1847–1940), a successful racehorse owner and breeder. The older horses' version was held at Maisons-Laffitte from 1943 to 1945, and on the first occasion it was contested over 3,100 metres. It returned to Longchamp in 1946, and its regular distance was extended to 3,100 metres in 1955.

The Prix Jean Prat for older horses was renamed the Prix Vicomtesse Vigier in 1985. This was in honour of Vicomtesse Vigier, Madeleine Double de Saint-Lambert (1869–1970), the niece of Jean Prat, who inherited her uncle's stable upon his death. The version for three-year-olds continued with the title Prix Jean Prat.

The Prix Vicomtesse Vigier used to be held several weeks before the Prix du Cadran, but that race was switched from May to October in 1991. The leading contenders often go on to compete in the latter event, and the last to win both in the same year was Vazirabad in 2017.

Records
Most successful horse (3 wins):
 Vazirabad – 2016, 2017, 2018

Leading jockey (6 wins):
 Yves Saint-Martin – Cirio (1963), Danseur (1967), Zamazaan (1969), Paseo (1970), Recupere (1974), Buckskin (1977)
 Freddy Head – Hallez (1971), Midshipman (1978), Campero (1979), Gold River (1981), Starski (1982), Dadarissime (1993)

Leading trainer (7 wins):
 Alain de Royer-Dupré – Starski (1982) Tajoun (1998), Shamdala (2006), Ivory Land (2012), Vazirabad (2016, 2017, 2018)

Leading owner (5 wins):
 Henri Delamarre – Pauvre Here (1861), Angus (1862), Clotaire (1872), Boiard (1874), Clio (1883)
 Marcel Boussac – Marsyas (1944, 1945), Arbar (1948), Marveil (1950), Scratch (1951)
 Aga Khan IV – Tajoun (1998), Shamdala (2006), Vazirabad (2016, 2017, 2018)

Winners since 1979

Earlier winners

 1859: Tippler
 1860: Light
 1861: Pauvre Here
 1862: Angus
 1863: Grande Puissance
 1864: Guillaume le Taciturne
 1865: Fille de l'Air
 1866: Fumee
 1867: Fleurette
 1868: Nemea
 1869: Mortemer
 1870: Cerdagne
 1871: no race
 1872: Clotaire
 1873: Revigny
 1874: Boiard
 1875: Bieville
 1876: Solo
 1877: Mondaine
 1878: Jongleur
 1879: Mourle
 1880: Vignemale
 1881: Beauminet / Le Destrier
 1882: Forum
 1883: Clio
 1884: Satory
 1885: Archiduc
 1886: Lapin
 1887: Alger
 1888: Brisolier
 1889: Galaor
 1890: Pourtant
 1891: Alicante
 1892: Gouverneur
 1893: Perdican
 1894: Lagrange
 1895: Canigou
 1896: Quelus
 1897:
 1898: Patriarche
 1899: Riverain
 1900: Germain
 1901: Codoman
 1902: La Camargo
 1903:
 1904: Nordenskjold
 1905: Gouvernant
 1906: Genial
 1907: Querido
 1908: Elysee
 1909: Sauge Pourpree
 1910: Oversight
 1911: Sablonnet
 1912: Joyeux
 1913: Predicateur
 1914: Nimbus
 1915–18: no race
 1919: Gave
 1920: Juveigneur
 1921: Odol
 1922: Harpocrate
 1923: Sens
 1924: Massine
 1925: Cadum
 1926: Tomy
 1927: Bois Josselyn
 1928: Sachet
 1929: Kantar
 1930: Cabire
 1931: Amfortas
 1932: Dark Agnes
 1933: Gris Perle
 1934: Casterari
 1935: Admiral Drake
 1936: Quorn
 1937: Fantastic
 1938: Malkowicze
 1939: Messines
 1940: Birikil
 1941: Maurepas
 1942: Le Pampre
 1943: Tornado
 1944: Marsyas
 1945: Marsyas
 1946: Chanteur
 1947: Souverain
 1948: Arbar
 1949: Espace Vital
 1950: Marveil
 1951: Scratch
 1952: Mat de Cocagne
 1953: Feu du Diable
 1954: Savoyard
 1955: Banassa
 1956: Polar
 1957: Oroso
 1958: Vacarme
 1959: Wallaby
 1960: Bel Baraka
 1961: Puissant Chef
 1962: Taine
 1963: Cirio
 1964: Celadon
 1965: White Label
 1966: Alyscamps
 1967: Danseur
 1968: Pardallo
 1969: Zamazaan
 1970: Paseo
 1971: Hallez
 1972: Parnell
 1973: Parnell
 1974: Recupere
 1975: Le Bavard
 1976: Citoyen
 1977: Buckskin
 1978: Midshipman

See also
 List of French flat horse races
 Recurring sporting events established in 1859  – this race is included under its original title, Prix Biennal.

References

 France Galop / Racing Post:

 galop.courses-france.com:
 1859–1889, 1890–1919, 1920–1949, 1950–1979, 1980–present

 france-galop.com – A Brief History: Prix Vicomtesse Vigier.
 galopp-sieger.de – Prix Vicomtesse Vigier (ex Prix Jean Prat / Prix Biennal).
 ifhaonline.org – International Federation of Horseracing Authorities – Prix Vicomtesse Vigier (2019).
 pedigreequery.com – Prix Vicomtesse Vigier – Longchamp.

Open long distance horse races
Longchamp Racecourse
Horse races in France